is a Japanese actor.

Filmography

Film
A Class to Remember IV (2000), Daisuke Kawashima
L: Change the WorLd (2008)
Confessions (2010)
From Me to You (2010)
64: Part I (2016)
64: Part II (2016)
Fragments of the Last Will (2022)
Baian the Assassin, M.D. 2 (2023)

Television   
Gō (2011), Oda Nobutaka
Reach Beyond the Blue Sky (2021), Sanjō Sanetomi
Galápagos (2023)

References

External links
Yuta Kanai Profile
 

Japanese male actors
Living people
1985 births
People from Western Tokyo